Churchdown School Academy (formerly Churchdown School) is a mixed secondary school and sixth form located in Churchdown in the English county of Gloucestershire.

Previously a foundation school administered by Gloucestershire County Council, Churchdown School was converted to academy status on 1 November 2011 and was renamed Churchdown School Academy. However the school continues to coordinate with Gloucestershire County Council for admissions.

Churchdown School Academy offers GCSEs and BTECs as programmes of study for pupils, while students in the sixth form have the option to study from a range of A Levels and further BTECs.

Notable former pupils
Mike Teague, former rugby union footballer

References

External links
Churchdown School Academy official website

Secondary schools in Gloucestershire
Academies in Gloucestershire